Steppenwolfer (March 16, 2003 - June 21, 2018) was an American Thoroughbred racehorse.  He was sired by Aptitude, who in turn was the son of the 1992 U.S. Horse of the Year and U.S. Racing Hall of Fame inductee, A.P. Indy, out of the mare, Wolfer.

He was a contender for the Triple Crown in 2006, but fell short by finishing third to Barbaro in the Kentucky Derby.

Steppenwolfer was gelded in 2009 and was retrained for steeplechasing. He did not win any of his starts in 2009 or 2010. Steppenwolfer was sold to Gail Thayer of Unionville, Pennsylvania and was re-trained as a foxhunter. The stipulations of his sale to Thayer state that he may never be re-sold.

Connections
Steppenwolfer was owned by Robert and Lawana Low. He was trained by Daniel Pietz and is ridden by Robby Albarado. He was bred in Kentucky by Nursery Place & Partners. He was first owned by two very successful horseman John Mayer the owner of Nursery Place Farm and his wife's brother Happy Broadbent. He was walked as a yearling by the two sons of John Mayer, Griffin the older of the two and Walker the younger, and then sold as a two-year-old for $25,000.

Races

References

 NTRA bio
 Steppenwolfer's pedigree with photo

Thoroughbred family 2-d
Racehorses trained in the United States
Racehorses bred in Kentucky
2003 racehorse births